Neolane, Inc. is a conversational marketing technology provider, which develops marketing automation and cross-channel campaign management software and services for business-to-business and business-to-consumer marketers. In 2012, Neolane recorded $58 million in revenue representing 40% year-over-year growth. It was announced in June 2013 that Adobe Systems would buy Neolane for $600 million.

History

Stephane Dehoche, Stephan Dietrich, Thomas Boudalier, and Benoit Gourdon founded Neolane in 2001. Three of the founders met in 1989 at the Ecole Centrale Paris in France where they founded their first company, AGDS. AGDS was quickly acquired by Apsylog and then sold to a software vendor, Peregrine Systems in 1996. Neolane is the third company the four founders have created together.

Neolane currently has offices in France, the United Kingdom, the Nordic region, North America, Munich, Sydney, and Singapore, as well as a support presence in Vietnam.  The first office opened in the Paris area in 2001. In 2005, the London area office opened followed by an office in Copenhagen. In December 2006, Neolane opened the first US office in the Boston, MA area. Offices in Munich, Sydney, and Singapore were opened in May 2013.

The company has received three rounds of funding, a seed round of €2 million in March 2002 by Auriga Partners, a second round in January 2007, when Neolane reported closing a $7 million funding led by XAnge Capital and XAnge Private Equity funds, with Auriga Partners, and in 2012, Neolane pulled in $27 million in a new funding round, led by Battery Ventures.

In 2013, the company was acquired by Adobe, and slowly re-branded. Now it is called Adobe Campaign, there are Standard and Classic versions.

Software

The Neolane software provides a cloud-based, web-services service that manages direct marketing campaigns, leads, resources, customer data and analytics. The software also allows companies to design and orchestrate targeted and personalized campaigns from direct mail, e-mail, SMS, MMS and more.

In March 2011, Neolane introduced a new application that gives marketers the ability to engage with customers on a one-to-one basis through social media tools like Facebook and Twitter, called “Neolane Social Marketing.”

Neolane offers consulting services, either through an in-house capability or through partners like Valtech, Acxiom or Epsilon. Neolane integrates with multiple CRM systems including Salesforce.com, Microsoft Dynamics CRM and Oracle/Siebel CRM On Demand.

References

Marketing companies of the United States